Edward Gleadall (died 1993, in Sheffield) was an English professional football winger. He played in the Football League for Bury and Scunthorpe & Lindsay United.

Gleadall joined Bury, making his debut in the 1951–52 season. He left in March 1957, joining Scunthorpe & Lindsay United.

On leaving Scunthorpe he joined Weymouth. He joined Mossley in 1959, leaving at the end the 1959–50 season.

References

Year of birth missing
1993 deaths
Footballers from Sheffield
English footballers
Bury F.C. players
Scunthorpe United F.C. players
Weymouth F.C. players
Mossley A.F.C. players
English Football League players
Association football wingers